Cyathochaeta teretifolia is a sedge of the family Cyperaceae that is native to Australia.

In Western Australia it is found along the margins of creeks and in swamps mostly along the coast in the Peel, South West and Great Southern regions where it grows in sandy-clay soils.

References

Plants described in 1903
Flora of Western Australia
teretifolia